Pilgrimage is the third studio album by American heavy metal band Om. It is the band's first release for the Southern Lord label. It was recorded at Electrical Audio by Steve Albini. It is the final studio album to feature Chris Hakius on drums.

Track listing

Personnel 
Om
Al Cisneros – bass guitar, vocals
Chris Hakius – drums, percussion

Production
Steve Albini – production, mixing, engineering
Bob Weston – mastering

References 

2007 albums
Albums produced by Steve Albini
Om (band) albums
Southern Lord Records albums